REV Ocean is a privately funded research and expedition vessel (REV) under construction by VARD shipyards.

Some sources describe her as a yacht, but unlike a yacht, her main purpose is not recreation or sports.

Design and construction  
REV Ocean was designed by Espen Øino with an interior by H2 Yacht Design. It was initially intended to be a 140 m superyacht with some research facilities, but during the design process she grew in size and was turned into a research and expedition vessel with a yacht-like exterior and high standards of comfort and design, including a luxury accommodation.

Contracts for construction and outfitting were signed in 2017, with an expected delivery in 2021. On June 17, 2021 it was announced that delivery was moved up to 2024.

The hull was built and equipped with the diesel-electric propulsion system in Tulcea, Romania, and initially launched on 24 August 2019. She was then towed to Brattvåg, Norway, where she is currently fitted out with more technology. Final interior outfit is planned to happen at Lloyd Werft, Bremerhaven, Germany.

Owner and operation
REV Ocean is the flagship of Norwegian billionaire businessman Kjell Inge Røkke's REV Ocean initiative. In an interview with the Norwegian newspaper Aftenposten (published 1 May 2017) Røkke said he planned to give away most of his fortune. As a further step in this plan he joined the Giving Pledge in 2017, and founded the REV Ocean initiative.

Led by former WWF Norway CEO Nina Jensen, REV Ocean is working to improve understanding of the ocean and foster concrete solutions through three initiatives: the world's largest research and expedition vessel (REV), the World Ocean Headquarters and an open, global data platform.

She is purpose built for scientific charter and environmental research missions.

Her TIER III hybrid propulsion allows a full-electric mode at eleven knots when the yacht collects samples. Her total operating range is 21,000 nautical miles.

References

Motor yachts
Research vessels